The Air Circus is a 1928 American drama film directed by Howard Hawks and starring Arthur Lake, Sue Carol, David Rollins, and Louise Dresser. It is the first of Hawks's aviation films. The film is notable as the first aviation oriented film with dialogue.

Plot
Two young men, "Speed" Doolittle (Arthur Lake) and Buddy Blake (David Rollins) go out west to become pilots. The pair encounter an accomplished aviator (Sue Carol) in flight school at a local airport.

Once at the school, the boys set about learning to fly. On his first solo flight, however, Buddy has a sudden attack of fear and almost kills himself and his instructor. Buddy despairs of becoming an aviator, and his mother (Louise Dresser) comes to comfort him.

Sue and Speed take off in an aircraft with defective landing gear, and Buddy, overcoming his fear, flies to their assistance.  He prevents Speed from landing until he and Sue have fixed the defective part.

Cast

 Arthur Lake as "Speed" Doolittle
 Sue Carol as Sue Manning
 David Rollins as Buddy Blake
 Louise Dresser as Mrs. Blake
 Heinie Conklin as Jerry McSwiggin
 Charles Delaney as Charles Manning
 Earl Robinson as Lt. Blake
 Virginia Cherrill as Extra (uncredited)

Production
The Air Circus is Hawks' seventh feature, and the first with sound dialog.  The film was completely finished as a silent when the studio commissioned dialog from screenwriter F. Hugh Herbert and assigned Lewis Seiler to insert 15 minutes of talking footage, which Hawks considered "mawkish".

Principal photography took place from April to June 1928 at Clover Field, Santa Monica, California.  Stunt pilot Dick Grace did most of the flying with Travel Air and Swallow biplanes featured.

Reception
The Air Circus received generally positive reviews from critics. Mordaunt Hall of The New York Times called it "a jolly, wholesome and refreshingly human picture", praising David Rollins' acting as "wonderfully natural."

The Film Daily said the film was well-acted with "a bang-up youth cast from all angles" and a "thrill finish." Oliver Claxton of The New Yorker wrote that the talking sequence was "the most unfortunate scene", but that the rest of the film "should amuse you in a quiet way." Variety was more modest in its praise, writing, "Expert direction has managed to make a fairly interesting lightweight number out of a script that holds nothing but background and a plot that doesn't exist."

Preservation status
Various sources classify it as lost. However, Hal Erickson states the silent version "was rescued from oblivion in the early 1970s".

References

Notes

Citations

Bibliography

 Beck, Simon D. The Aircraft-Spotter's Film and Television Companion. Jefferson, North Carolina: McFarland and Company, 2016. .
 McCarthy, Todd. Howard Hawks: The Grey Fox of Hollywood. New York: Grove Press, 2000. .
 Paris, Michael. From the Wright Brothers to Top Gun: Aviation, Nationalism, and Popular Cinema. Manchester, UK: Manchester University Press, 1995. .
 Pendo, Stephen. Aviation in the Cinema. Lanham, Maryland: Scarecrow Press, 1985. .
 Wynne, H. Hugh. The Motion Picture Stunt Pilots and Hollywood's Classic Aviation Movies. Missoula, Montana: Pictorial Histories Publishing Co., 1987. .

External links

lobby poster

1928 films
American silent feature films
American aviation films
American black-and-white films
Films directed by Howard Hawks
Transitional sound drama films
1928 drama films
American women aviators
Fox Film films
1920s English-language films
1920s American films